Staro-Volzhsky is a rural locality (a settlement) in Zhitninsky Selsoviet, Ikryaninsky District, Astrakhan Oblast, Russia. The population was 968 as of 2010. There are 7 streets.

Geography 
Staro-Volzhsky is located 34 km south of Ikryanoye (the district's administrative centre) by road. Chulpan is the nearest rural locality.

References 

Rural localities in Ikryaninsky District